The Accademia di Belle Arti di Carrara is a public tertiary academy of art in Carrara, in Tuscany, Italy. It was founded on 26 September 1769 by Maria Teresa Cybo-Malaspina, duchess of Massa and princess of Carrara; but its origins go back to 1757, when, on the advice of the sculptor , she founded the Accademia di San Ceccardo in which sculpture, architecture and painting were to be taught. To house it, she commissioned Filippo del Medico to design and build a new building (which is now the Biblioteca Civica); in 1807, by order of Elisa Bonaparte Baciocchi, the accademia was moved the Palazzo del Principe. The school of architecture was at first under Filippo del Medico;  was head of the school of sculpture.

Like other state art academies in Italy, it became an autonomous degree-awarding institution under law no. 508 dated 21 December 1999, and falls under the Ministero dell'Istruzione, dell'Universita e della Ricerca, the Italian ministry of education and research.

References 

Art schools in Italy
Carrara
Educational institutions established in 1769
1769 establishments in the Grand Duchy of Tuscany